Daniel Jeffery Henderson (born August 24, 1970) is an American retired mixed martial artist and Olympic wrestler, who last competed as a middleweight in the Ultimate Fighting Championship. He was the last Strikeforce Light Heavyweight Champion and was the last Welterweight and Middleweight champion of Pride Fighting Championships. Henderson was the Brazil Open '97 Tournament Champion, the UFC 17 Middleweight Tournament Champion, the Rings: King of Kings 1999 Tournament Champion and the Pride Welterweight Grand Prix Tournament Champion. Henderson also challenged for the UFC Middleweight Championship (2x), the UFC Light Heavyweight Championship and the Strikeforce Middleweight Championship. Henderson was the first mixed martial artist to hold two titles in two different weight classes concurrently in a major MMA promotion. At the time of his retirement after UFC 204, he was the oldest fighter on the UFC roster.

Wrestling career
Dan Henderson was born in Downey, California and grew up in Apple Valley, California. He competed in freestyle wrestling, but is much better known for his achievements in Greco-Roman wrestling.

He attended Victor Valley High School in Victorville, California, and earned medals at the California State Wrestling Championships in 1987 and 1988.  He placed second in 1987 and fifth in 1988. He was a member of the 1987 Victor Valley High School wrestling team state champions.  In 1988 Henderson became a national junior champion in both Greco-Roman and freestyle wrestling.

After high school Henderson delayed pursuing a college wrestling career, yet he would go to wrestle a season each at Cal State Fullerton (CSUF) and Arizona State University (ASU). He qualified for the 1993 NCAA championships.

In Greco-Roman wrestling Henderson became the university national champion in 1991, 1993, and 1994. He was the national champion at the senior level in 1993, 1994, and 1997. He represented the United States in the 1992 and 1996 Summer Olympics and placed 10th and 12th, respectively.

Henderson competed at the World Wrestling Championships in 1994 and 1997, placing 12th and 7th respectively. Other notable accomplishments include a bronze medal at the 1995 Pan American Games and a gold medal in the 2000 Pan American Championships. At this competition Henderson upset Luis Enrique Méndez in the final.

Henderson failed to qualify for the 2000 Olympics. He reached the 2001 world team trials finals, but was defeated by Matt Lindland, and after that focused on an MMA career.

Henderson was also assistant wrestling coach at Cerritos College during the 1990s.

Mixed martial arts career
Henderson began training in mixed martial arts in 1997, when he joined the Real American Wrestling team (RAW).

Brazil Open Tournament
1997 saw Henderson make his debut in MMA, following in the footsteps of other wrestlers who were finding success in the sport. Henderson entered the Brazil Open Lightweight Tournament, which had a weight limit of 176 pounds, the lightest Henderson would ever compete at. It was a one-night tournament, featuring four competitors. After two relatively quick finishes, Henderson won the championship.

UFC 17
Less than one year later, Henderson entered his second MMA tournament, also a four-man tournament to be completed in one night. This time however, the weight limit was 199 pounds. UFC 17 would mark the start of Henderson's on-again off-again relationship with the UFC, which would span nearly two decades.  He defeated Allan Goes and Carlos Newton in closely contested contests to earn his second MMA tournament championship. A punch delivered from Newton in their fight broke Henderson's jaw, but he continued fighting through it.

Rings: King Of Kings
About eighteen months later, Henderson entered his third MMA tournament. This time the number of competitors was 32, and there was no weight limit for any of the fighters. The tournament would be held over the course of two nights. The first two rounds were held in late 1999, while the final three were in early 2000. The tournament was full of many notable competitors, and Henderson faced Gilbert Yvel, Antônio Rodrigo Nogueira, and Renato Sobral. Despite weighing in at 199 pounds, and routinely being outweighed by more than 30 pounds, Henderson won all five of his fights, and became the Rings: King of Kings Tournament 1999 champion.

PRIDE Fighting Championships

Henderson began competing in Pride Fighting Championships in late 2000. He entered in three tournaments for the organization, winning the Welterweight (183 pounds) tournament at Pride Shockwave 2005 by defeating Murilo Bustamante by split decision. The opening two rounds of the eight-man tournament were fought at Pride Bushido 9, at which Henderson knocked out both Ryo Chonan and Akihiro Gono. Along with this tournament victory, he was awarded the Pride Welterweight Championship.

In 2006, Henderson lost a decision in a rematch against Kazuo Misaki. It was the first time in that he had lost a fight to an opponent who was under 205 pounds. Henderson's final Pride bout was a rematch with Wanderlei Silva at Pride 33 in Las Vegas, Nevada on February 24, 2007, at which he scored a knockout victory to become Middleweight Champion (205 pounds), while still holding his Welterweight title. Henderson became the first fighter to hold titles in two different weight classes simultaneously in a major MMA organization. Overall, Henderson went 13–5 with Pride, with eight victories coming by stoppage.

UFC return
On September 8, 2007, Henderson returned to the UFC to face light heavyweight champion Quinton "Rampage" Jackson at UFC 75 in London, England. In a closely contested fight that saw Henderson impose his will early, Jackson controlled the later rounds and won a five-round unanimous decision to retain his title and gain the Pride middleweight title.

On November 17, 2007, it was announced during the post fight at UFC 78 that Henderson would fight UFC middleweight champion Anderson Silva to unify the Pride welterweight (183 lb) and UFC middleweight (185 lb) championships.  UFC 82 took place on March 1, 2008, and was held at the Nationwide Arena in Columbus, Ohio. Despite winning the first round, Henderson lost via submission at 4:52 of the second round by rear naked choke.

Henderson bounced back from his inauspicious start in the UFC with a victory over Rousimar Palhares at UFC 88, winning by unanimous decision. After ten years in the sport, it was his first UFC victory. After the bout, Henderson laughed and said, "Hopefully I don't have to wait that long before I get my next win."

Henderson returned to the light heavyweight division to face former UFC Middleweight champion Rich Franklin on January 17, 2009, at UFC 93 in Dublin, Ireland. Henderson won the fight via a split decision following an eye-poke in the third round that many, including Franklin, thought was intentional. He was subsequently selected to lead Team U.S. on season 9 of The Ultimate Fighter, with Michael Bisping coaching the opposing Team UK.

Coaching The Ultimate Fighter and aftermath
The reality TV show, which spawned a feud between the two coaches that continued until their fight, aired on Spike TV and premiered on April 1, 2009, with the live finale on June 20, 2009, in Las Vegas.

On July 11, 2009, at UFC 100 at the Mandalay Bay Events Center in Las Vegas, Henderson and Bisping fought, culminating in Henderson becoming the first man to knock Bisping out, doing so in the second round with an overhand right to the jaw as Bisping was circling to Henderson's right. This win put Henderson back into contention for a title shot at the UFC Middleweight Champion. The knockout punch won Henderson a $100,000 bonus for "Knockout of the Night" and is considered one of the greatest knockouts in the history of the sport.

Controversy arose from the fight due to Henderson immediately following up his knockout punch with a flying forearm-drop to the undefended Bisping's head shortly before referee Mario Yamasaki ended the fight at 3:20.

Immediately after the fight, Henderson stated that "I hit him hard, but I got that last blow in just to shut him up a little bit." After UFC president Dana White said Henderson had made the comment in jest, Henderson clarified by stating, "When you're in the heat of the moment, the ref hadn't stopped me yet, who knows what's going to happen, if he's going to recover. I really only hit him twice, once on my feet, once on the ground. I didn't keep going. I didn't go after him after the ref tried to stop me, it was nothing like that. It was a reaction of mine to keep going until I was stopped—and you know, it did feel good though."

Strikeforce
Dan Henderson signed a four-fight, 16-month deal with Strikeforce on December 5, 2009, after his contract expired with the UFC. Henderson made his Strikeforce debut on April 17, 2010, at Strikeforce on CBS against Jake Shields. He was also eyed for a light heavyweight match against Gegard Mousasi, and expressed interest in eventually fighting Fedor Emelianenko at some point during his contract.
Henderson lost his Strikeforce debut to Jake Shields. Despite hurting Shields and knocking him down in the 1st round, Henderson went on to lose by unanimous decision. The majority of the last rounds were spent on the ground where Shields controlled the fight via grappling. (49–46, 49–45, 48–45).

Henderson faced Renato Sobral on December 4, 2010, at Strikeforce: Henderson vs. Babalu. Henderson won the fight via KO at 1:53 of the first round.

Henderson defeated Rafael Cavalcante via third-round TKO for the Strikeforce Light Heavyweight Championship at Strikeforce 32.  After two rounds in which all three judges had the score tied 19–19, Henderson dropped Cavalcante with his famed right hand in the third before referee Dan Miragliotta called the fight off at the 0:50 mark.

Henderson fought Fedor Emelianenko on July 30, 2011, at Strikeforce: Fedor vs. Henderson. Many had speculated that Henderson would meet Fedor at a catch weight, but Strikeforce later confirmed the fight as a heavyweight bout. Henderson said, "Its tough for me to gain weight.  I did weightlifting and plenty of eating; I don't know what else I'm supposed to do.  I'm not going to feel outmatched or small in there." He had to step on the scales weighing at least 206 pounds in order to qualify for the heavyweight division, and weighed in at 207. Fedor weighed in a bit below his normal weight, with the scale reading 223 pounds. Henderson defeated Emelianenko via KO at 4:12 of the 1st round. This was the last fight on Henderson's Strikeforce contract. Henderson said he would like to re-sign to defend his Strikeforce Light Heavyweight Championship.

Third UFC run
Shortly after the UFC 133 pre-fight press conference, Dana White commented on the potential to bring Henderson back to the UFC for a third go-around. "We'll see what happens," White said on Thursday in Philadelphia. "'Hendo and I have had some history in dealing. We'll see if we can figure something out and get him back in the UFC." Later Henderson commented, "I think the biggest fight they could promote is probably a title unification with whoever is the champ in the UFC."

Henderson faced Maurício Rua on November 19, 2011, at UFC 139 for his third run in the UFC. He won the bout via unanimous decision. The back and forth action earned both fighters Fight of the Night honors, and was described by many as one of the greatest fights in UFC history.

UFC President Dana White announced during the post-fight press conference of UFC 145 that Henderson would be the next opponent for Light Heavyweight Champion Jon Jones.

The bout with Jones was expected to take place on September 1, 2012, at UFC 151. However, Henderson withdrew from the fight citing a knee injury, and the remainder of the fight card was cancelled.

Henderson faced Lyoto Machida on February 23, 2013, at UFC 157. He lost the bout via split decision.

Henderson faced Rashad Evans on June 15, 2013, in the main event at UFC 161. He lost via split decision.

Henderson faced Vitor Belfort in a rematch on November 9, 2013, at UFC Fight Night 32.  Henderson defeated Belfort in their first encounter in 2006 at Pride 32 via unanimous decision. He lost the fight via knockout in the first round, marking the first time in his MMA career that he had been stopped due to strikes.  The match with Belfort was the last fight of Henderson's contract with UFC.  On January 22, Henderson revealed to UFC Tonight that he signed a new, six-fight contract with the UFC.

In January 2014, a rematch with Maurício Rua was announced to take place on March 23, 2014, at UFC Fight Night 38.  Despite losing the first two rounds after being knocked down by Rua, Henderson rallied back in the third round and won the fight via TKO due to punches. The win also earned Henderson his third Fight of the Night bonus and first Performance of the Night bonus.

Making a quick return to the cage, Henderson faced a much larger Daniel Cormier on May 24, 2014, at UFC 173. He lost the fight via submission (technical submission/rear-naked choke) in the third round after being out-wrestled and held down on the bottom for the majority of the fight.

On November 12, 2014, the UFC announced that Henderson would move down to Middleweight to face Gegard Mousasi on January 24, 2015, in the co-main event at UFC on Fox 14. He lost the fight via TKO in the first round.

Henderson faced Tim Boetsch on June 6, 2015, in the main event at UFC Fight Night 68.  He won the fight via knockout at 28 seconds of the first round.

Henderson faced Vitor Belfort in a rubber match in the main event at UFC Fight Night 77. He again lost the bout via a combination of head kick and punches.

A rematch with Lyoto Machida was expected to take place at Middleweight on April 16, 2016, at UFC on Fox 19. However, on April 13, the UFC announced that Machida declared the usage of a banned substance during an out-of-competition sample collection last week. Machida stated that he was unaware that the substance was prohibited both in and out of competition. Therefore, he was removed from the bout and Henderson was re-booked for another event at a later date.

Henderson was quickly rescheduled to face Héctor Lombard on June 4, 2016, at UFC 199. He won the fight via knockout in the second round via a head kick followed by a reverse elbow and earned himself a Performance of the Night bonus, as well as becoming the first fighter to knock Lombard out cold.

Henderson faced then UFC Middleweight Champion Michael Bisping, in a rematch on October 8, 2016, at UFC 204. Despite dropping and nearly finishing Bisping in both the first and second round, he wound up losing the back and forth fight via unanimous decision. Both fighters were awarded Fight of the Night for their performance. At the conclusion of the fight, Henderson confirmed his intention to retire from fighting.

Dan Henderson was inducted into the Fight Wing of the UFC Hall of Fame at the UFC Fan Expo on July 5, 2018, alongside Maurício Rua, for their fight in 2011.

Personal life
Henderson grew up on a ranch in Apple Valley, California. He started wrestling at a young age and started being noticed as a relentless competitor. When he entered high school he placed on the wrestling team with his brother Tom at Victor Valley High, which was coached by Sam Gollmyer and assisted by their father Bill Henderson and Joe Barrios. 
He is of Native American, English, Scottish and French descent. Henderson had previously been prescribed testosterone replacement therapy (TRT) after being diagnosed with low testosterone levels in 2007. However, TRT has no longer been allowed in UFC competition since 2014. After TRT was banned, Henderson said that he quit using TRT "cold turkey".

Henderson was coached by Bob Anderson, of the defunct California Jets.  He placed second at the California State Wrestling Championship in 1987 and Victor Valley won the team title. In 1988, he placed fifth in the state finals and several months later won national crowns in both freestyle and Greco Roman at the Junior Nationals in Cedar Falls, Iowa.

According to the March 2007 Confederated Umatilla Journal: "Henderson's grandmother, Alice (Bergevin) LeJune, is an enrolled member of the Confederated Tribes and owns land on the Umatilla Indian Reservation. From all accounts, Henderson is 1/16 Walla Walla Native American." In the interview Henderson commented, "Now I know I'm Walla Walla. It's refreshing to find some of those things out. I look Indian and I knew I had some, but I didn't know what tribe or exactly how much. It will be good to be able to tell my kids about their heritage."

Team Quest
Dan Henderson is an owner of Team Quest Fitness Gym located in Temecula, California.

As of February 28, 2011, Henderson is in litigation over the Team Quest trademark with former teammate Matt Lindland.

Championships and awards
UFC Hall of Fame - Fight Wing

Mixed martial arts
Ultimate Fighting Championship
UFC 17 Middleweight Tournament Championship
Fight of the Night (Four times)
Knockout of the Night (One time)
Performance of the Night (Two times)
2011 Fight of the Year vs. Maurício Rua on November 19
Oldest combatant to fight for a UFC championship (46 years)
UFC Hall of Fame (Fight wing, class of 2018) vs. Maurício Rua at UFC 139
Pride Fighting Championships
Pride Middleweight Championship (One time; Last)
Pride Welterweight Championship (One time; First; Last)
2005 Pride Welterweight Grand Prix Champion
First combatant to win Pride championships in multiple weight classes
First combatant to simultaneously hold multiple Pride championships
One of only two fighters to win Tournaments in both Pride FC and UFC
Strikeforce
Strikeforce Light Heavyweight Championship (One time, Last)
Oldest combatant to win a Strikeforce championship (40 years, 194 days)
Fighting Network RINGS
RINGS King of Kings 1999 Tournament Winner
Brazil Open Fight
Brazil Open 1997 Lightweight Tournament Winner
World MMA Awards
2009 Knockout of the Year vs. Michael Bisping at UFC 100
ESPN
2011 Fight of the Year vs. Maurício Rua on November 19
2011 Round of the Year vs. Maurício Rua on November 19; Round 1
Sherdog
2011 All-Violence Second Team
Inside MMA
2011 Fight of the Year Bazzie Award vs. Maurício Rua on November 19
Wrestling Observer Newsletter
2011 Fight of the Year vs. Maurício Rua on November 19
MMAFighting
2011 Fight of the Year vs. Maurício Rua on November 19
Yahoo! Sports
2011 Fight of the Year vs. Maurício Rua on November 19
2009 Knockout of the Year vs. Michael Bisping on July 11
FIGHT! Magazine
2009 Knockout of the Year vs. Michael Bisping on July 11
Bleacher Report
2009 Knockout of the Year vs. Michael Bisping on July 11
Black Belt Magazine
2007 MMA Fighter of the Year
Black Belt Magazine Hall of Famer

Amateur wrestling
International Federation of Associated Wrestling Styles
2000 Henri Deglane Challenge Senior Greco-Roman Bronze Medalist
2000 Pan American Championships Senior-Greco Roman Gold Medalist
1999 Nordvest Cup Senior Greco-Roman Bronze Medalist
1998 Henri Deglane Challenge Senior Greco-Roman Bronze Medalist
1998 Pan American Championships Senior Greco-Roman Bronze Medalist
1998 FILA Test Tournament Senior Greco-Roman Gold Medalist
1998 Tropheo Milone Tournament Senior Greco-Roman Gold Medalist
1998 Vehbi Emri Tournament Senior Greco-Roman Silver Medalist
1997 Concord Cup International Senior Greco-Roman Silver Medalist
1997 Gold Medal Challenge Senior Greco-Roman Gold Medalist
1996 World Cup Senior Greco-Roman Silver Medalist
1995 Pan American Games Senior Greco-Roman Bronze Medalist
1995 Sunkist Kids International Open Senior Greco-Roman Gold Medalist
1994 World Cup Senior Greco-Roman Silver Medalist
1994 Pan American Championships Senior Greco-Roman Silver Medalist
1990 World Wrestling Championships Junior Greco-Roman Gold Medalist
1984 Pan American Championships Senior Greco-Roman Silver Medalist
National Wrestling Hall of Fame and Museum
Lifetime Service to Wrestling Award (2010)
California Wrestling Hall of Fame
2013 CWHOF Inductee
USA Wrestling
USA Senior Greco-Roman Olympic Team Trials Winner (1992, 1996)
Senior Greco-Roman World Team Trials Winner (1994, 1997)
Senior Greco-Roman World Team Trials Runner-up (1999, 2001)
USA Senior Greco-Roman National Championship (1993, 1994, 1997)
USA Senior Greco-Roman National Championship Runner-up (2000)
USA University Greco-Roman National Championship (1991, 1993, 1994)
USA Junior Greco-Roman National Championship (1988)
USA Junior Freestyle National Championship (1988)
1999 Mini-Tournament at World Team Trials Senior Greco-Roman Gold Medalist
Amateur Wrestling News Magazine
1990 Amateur Wrestling News Freshman All-American
California Interscholastic Federation
CIF High School State Championship Runner-up (1987)
CIF All-State (1987, 1988)
CIF Southern Section Championship (1987, 1988)

Mixed martial arts record

|-
|Loss
|align=center| 32–15
|Michael Bisping
|Decision (unanimous)
|UFC 204 
|
|align=center|5
|align=center|5:00
|Manchester, England
|
|-
| Win
| align=center| 32–14
| Héctor Lombard
| KO (elbow)
| UFC 199
|  
| align=center| 2
| align=center| 1:27
| Inglewood, California, United States
| 
|-
| Loss
| align=center| 31–14
| Vitor Belfort
| KO (punches)
| UFC Fight Night: Belfort vs. Henderson 3
| 
| align=center| 1 
| align=center| 2:07
| São Paulo, Brazil
|
|-
| Win
| align=center| 31–13
| Tim Boetsch
| KO (punches)
| UFC Fight Night: Boetsch vs. Henderson
| 
| align=center| 1
| align=center| 0:28
| New Orleans, Louisiana, United States
|
|-
| Loss
| align=center| 30–13
| Gegard Mousasi
| TKO (punches)
| UFC on Fox: Gustafsson vs. Johnson
| 
| align=center| 1
| align=center| 1:10
| Stockholm, Sweden
| 
|-
| Loss
| align=center| 30–12
| Daniel Cormier
| Technical Submission (rear-naked choke)
| UFC 173
| 
| align=center| 3
| align=center| 3:53
| Las Vegas, Nevada, United States
|
|-
| Win
| align=center| 30–11
| Maurício Rua
| TKO (punches)
| UFC Fight Night: Shogun vs. Henderson 2
|  
| align=center| 3
| align=center| 1:31
| Natal, Brazil
| 
|-
| Loss
| align=center| 29–11
| Vitor Belfort
| KO (head kick)
| UFC Fight Night: Belfort vs. Henderson 2
| 
| align=center| 1 
| align=center| 1:17 
| Goiânia, Brazil
| 
|-
| Loss
| align=center| 29–10
| Rashad Evans
| Decision (split)
| UFC 161
| 
| align=center| 3
| align=center| 5:00
| Winnipeg, Manitoba, Canada
| 
|-
| Loss
| align=center| 29–9
| Lyoto Machida
| Decision (split)
| UFC 157
| 
| align=center| 3
| align=center| 5:00
| Anaheim, California, United States
| 
|-
| Win
| align=center| 29–8
| Maurício Rua
| Decision (unanimous)
| UFC 139
| 
| align=center| 5
| align=center| 5:00
| San Jose, California, United States
| 
|-
| Win
| align=center| 28–8
| Fedor Emelianenko
| TKO (punches)
| Strikeforce: Fedor vs. Henderson
| 
| align=center| 1
| align=center| 4:12
| Hoffman Estates, Illinois, United States
| 
|-
| Win
| align=center| 27–8
| Rafael Cavalcante
| TKO (punches)
| Strikeforce: Feijao vs. Henderson
| 
| align=center| 3
| align=center| 0:50
| Columbus, Ohio, United States
| 
|-
| Win
| align=center| 26–8
| Renato Sobral
| KO (punches)
| Strikeforce: St. Louis
| 
| align=center| 1
| align=center| 1:53
| St. Louis, Missouri, United States
| 
|-
| Loss
| align=center| 25–8
| Jake Shields
| Decision (unanimous)
| Strikeforce: Nashville
| 
| align=center| 5
| align=center| 5:00
| Nashville, Tennessee, United States
| 
|-
| Win
| align=center| 25–7
| Michael Bisping
| KO (punch) 
| UFC 100
| 
| align=center| 2
| align=center| 3:20
| Las Vegas, Nevada, United States
| 
|-
| Win
| align=center| 24–7
| Rich Franklin
| Decision (split)
| UFC 93
| 
| align=center| 3
| align=center| 5:00
| Dublin, Ireland
| 
|-
| Win
| align=center| 23–7
| Rousimar Palhares
| Decision (unanimous)
| UFC 88
| 
| align=center| 3
| align=center| 5:00
| Atlanta, Georgia, United States
| 
|-
| Loss
| align=center| 22–7
| Anderson Silva
| Submission (rear-naked choke)
| UFC 82
| 
| align=center| 2
| align=center| 4:52
| Columbus, Ohio, United States
| 
|-
| Loss
| align=center| 22–6
| Quinton Jackson
| Decision (unanimous)
| UFC 75
| 
| align=center| 5
| align=center| 5:00
| London, England
| 
|-
| Win
| align=center| 22–5
| Wanderlei Silva
| KO (punches)
| Pride 33
| 
| align=center| 3
| align=center| 2:08
| Las Vegas, Nevada, United States
| 
|-
| Win
| align=center| 21–5
| Vitor Belfort
| Decision (unanimous)
| Pride 32 – The Real Deal
| 
| align=center| 3
| align=center| 5:00
| Las Vegas, Nevada, United States
| 
|-
| Loss
| align=center| 20–5
| Kazuo Misaki
| Decision (unanimous)
| Pride – Bushido 12
| 
| align=center| 2
| align=center| 5:00
| Nagoya, Japan
|
|-
| Win
| align=center| 20–4
| Kazuo Misaki
| Decision (unanimous)
| Pride – Bushido 10
| 
| align=center| 2
| align=center| 5:00
| Tokyo, Japan
| 
|-
| Win
| align=center| 19–4
| Murilo Bustamante
| Decision (split)
| Pride Shockwave 2005
| 
| align=center| 2
| align=center| 5:00
| Saitama, Japan
| 
|-
| Win
| align=center| 18–4
| Akihiro Gono
| KO (punch)
| rowspan=2|Pride Bushido 9
| rowspan=2|
| align=center| 1
| align=center| 7:58
| rowspan=2|Tokyo, Japan
| 
|-
| Win
| align=center| 17–4
| Ryo Chonan
| KO (punch)
| align=center| 1
| align=center| 0:22
| 
|-
| Loss
| align=center| 16–4
| Antônio Rogério Nogueira
| Submission (armbar)
| Pride Total Elimination 2005
| 
| align=center| 1
| align=center| 8:05
| Osaka, Japan
| 
|-
| Win
| align=center| 16–3
| Yuki Kondo
| Decision (split)
| Pride Shockwave 2004
| 
| align=center| 3
| align=center| 5:00
| Saitama, Japan
| 
|-
| Win
| align=center| 15–3
| Kazuhiro Nakamura
| TKO (shoulder injury)
| Pride 28
| 
| align=center| 1
| align=center| 1:15
| Saitama, Japan
| 
|-
| Win
| align=center| 14–3
| Murilo Bustamante
| TKO (punches)
| Pride Final Conflict 2003
| 
| align=center| 1
| align=center| 0:53
| Tokyo, Japan
| 
|-
| Win
| align=center| 13–3
| Shungo Oyama
| TKO (punches)
| Pride 25
| 
| align=center| 1
| align=center| 3:28
| Yokohama, Japan
| 
|-
| Loss
| align=center| 12–3
| Antônio Rodrigo Nogueira
| Submission (armbar)
| Pride 24
| 
| align=center| 3
| align=center| 1:49
| Fukuoka, Japan
| 
|-
| Loss
| align=center| 12–2
| Ricardo Arona
| Decision (split)
| Pride 20
| 
| align=center| 3
| align=center| 5:00
| Yokohama, Japan
| 
|-
| Win
| align=center| 12–1
| Murilo Rua
| Decision (split)
| Pride 17
| 
| align=center| 3
| align=center| 5:00
| Tokyo, Japan
| 
|-
| Win
| align=center| 11–1
| Akira Shoji
| TKO (punches and knees)
| Pride 14 – Clash of the Titans
| 
| align=center| 3
| align=center| 3:18
| Yokohama, Japan
| 
|-
| Win
| align=center| 10–1
| Renzo Gracie
| KO (punch)
| Pride 13 – Collision Course
| 
| align=center| 1
| align=center| 1:40
| Saitama, Japan
| 
|-
| Loss
| align=center| 9–1
| Wanderlei Silva
| Decision (unanimous)
| Pride 12 – Cold Fury
| 
| align=center| 2
| align=center| 10:00
| Saitama, Japan
| 
|-
| Win
| align=center| 9–0
| Renato Sobral
| Decision (majority)
| rowspan=3|Rings: King of Kings 1999 Final
| rowspan=3|
| align=center| 2
| align=center| 5:00
| rowspan=3|Tokyo, Japan
| 
|-
| Win
| align=center| 8–0
| Antônio Rodrigo Nogueira
| Decision (split)
| align=center| 3
| align=center| 5:00
| 
|-
| Win
| align=center| 7–0
| Gilbert Yvel
| Decision (unanimous)
| align=center| 2
| align=center| 5:00
| 
|-
| Win
| align=center| 6–0
| Hiromitsu Kanehara
| Decision (majority)
| rowspan=2|Rings: King of Kings 1999 Block A
| rowspan=2|
| align=center| 2
| align=center| 5:00
| rowspan=2|Tokyo, Japan
| 
|-
| Win
| align=center| 5–0
| Bakouri Gogitidze
| TKO (submission to knee to the body)
| align=center| 1
| align=center| 2:17
| 
|-
| Win
| align=center| 4–0
| Carlos Newton
| Decision (split)
| rowspan=2|UFC 17
| rowspan=2|
| align=center| 1
| align=center| 15:00
| rowspan=2|Mobile, Alabama, United States
| 
|-
| Win
| align=center| 3–0
| Allan Goes
| Decision (unanimous)
| align=center| 1
| align=center| 15:00
| 
|-
| Win
| align=center| 2–0
| Eric Smith
| Technical Submission (guillotine choke)
| rowspan=2|Brazil Open '97
| rowspan=2|
| align=center| 1
| align=center| 0:30
| rowspan=2|Brazil
| 
|-
| Win
| align=center| 1–0
| Crezio de Souza
| TKO (punches)
| align=center| 1
| align=center| 5:25
|

Submission grappling record
{| class="wikitable sortable" style="font-size:80%; text-align:left;"
|-
| colspan=8 style="text-align:center;" | 2 Matches, 2 Losses (2 Submissions)
|-
!  Result
!  Rec.
!  Opponent
!  Method
!  text-center|  Event
!  Division
!  Date
!  Location
|-
|Loss||0-2|| Jon Jones || Submission (arm-triangle choke) || Submission Underground 2||Superfight|| December 10, 2016 ||  Portland, OR
|-
|Loss||0-1|| Frank Shamrock || Submission (heel hook) || The Contenders||Superfight||October 11, 1997||   Sioux City, IA
|-

Championship titles

Filmography

See also
 List of male mixed martial artists
 List of Pride FC alumni
 List of Pride champions
 List of Strikeforce alumni
 List of Strikeforce champions
 List of UFC tournament winners
 List of male mixed martial artists

Notes

References

External links
 
 
 
 

1971 births
Living people
American male mixed martial artists
American people of Native American descent
Mixed martial artists from California
Sportspeople from California
Sportspeople from Downey, California
Sportspeople from Temecula, California
People from California
People from Downey, California
People from Apple Valley, California
Welterweight mixed martial artists
Middleweight mixed martial artists
Light heavyweight mixed martial artists
Heavyweight mixed martial artists
Pride Fighting Championships champions
Strikeforce (mixed martial arts) champions
Wrestlers at the 1992 Summer Olympics
Wrestlers at the 1996 Summer Olympics
American male sport wrestlers
Pan American Games bronze medalists for the United States
Pan American Games medalists in wrestling
Wrestlers at the 1995 Pan American Games
People from Victorville, California
Olympic wrestlers of the United States
Medalists at the 1995 Pan American Games
Mixed martial artists utilizing collegiate wrestling
Mixed martial artists utilizing Greco-Roman wrestling
Walla Walla people